Troy Jason Matteson (born November 8, 1979) is an American professional golfer who plays on the PGA Tour.

Amateur career
Matteson was born in Rockledge, Florida. He played college golf at Georgia Tech and won the NCAA Individual Championship in 2002.

Professional career

Nationwide Tour
Matteson joined the Nationwide Tour in 2004. He set the record for the most money won in one season on the Nationwide Tour during the 2005 season, picking up $495,009 while recording victories at the Virginia Beach Open and the Mark Christopher Charity Classic. This earned him a promotion to the PGA Tour for 2006. His record was eclipsed in 2009 by Michael Sim.

PGA Tour
Matteson picked up his first win on the PGA Tour at the Frys.com Open on October 15, 2006. He struggled during most of 2006 but finished in the top-10 in his last five events en route to a career best 36th-place finish on the money list.

Matteson continued to be consistent in 2007 and 2008, finishing 73rd and 89th on the money list respectively. He finished in a tie for second at the 2008 PODS Championship.

In 2009 at the Frys.com Open (not the same Frys.com Open that Matteson won in 2006) in Scottsdale, Arizona, Matteson set a 36-hole PGA Tour scoring record. Matteson shot 61-61 on Friday and Saturday for a total of 122 strokes. This feat beat the record of 123 set earlier in the season by Steve Stricker at the Bob Hope Classic. He went on to win the tournament in a three-man playoff over Rickie Fowler and Jamie Lovemark. He went on to finish 56th on the money list.

In 2010, Matteson finished 128th on the money list, which would normally mean a conditional Tour card and a trip to qualifying school. However, his win in 2009 earned him a two-year exemption until the end of 2011. Matteson almost picked up his third PGA Tour victory in March 2011 at the Puerto Rico Open but lost to Michael Bradley in a playoff. He would go on to finish 94th on the money list.

In July 2012, Matteson finished second at the John Deere Classic after losing out in a playoff to Zach Johnson. The pair were tied at 20 under par after regulation play and at the first extra hole both players made double bogey after finding the water hazard with their second shots into the 18th. Johnson won the playoff with a birdie on the second extra hole when he tapped in from less than a foot after a superb approach, while Matteson could not hole his 43-footer to extend the playoff. However Matteson secure a place in The Open Championship for the first time in his career by finishing as the highest non-qualifier at the event.

In 2013, he made only 10 cuts in 24 events. He played in the Web.com Tour Finals and finished 17th to retain his PGA Tour card for 2014.

Swing style
Matteson tends to hit a long and high push-draw. His swing fits the model known as stack and tilt and he is coached by its creators, Mike Bennett and Andy Plummer. He performs a clear spine tilt to the left on back swing and places his body weight favoring the left foot throughout the whole swing.

Professional wins (4)

PGA Tour wins (2)

PGA Tour playoff record (1–2)

Nationwide Tour wins (2)

Results in major championships

CUT = missed the half-way cut
"T" = tied

Results in The Players Championship

CUT = missed the halfway cut
"T" indicates a tie for a place

Results in World Golf Championships

"T" = Tied

See also
2005 Nationwide Tour graduates
2013 Web.com Tour Finals graduates

References

External links

American male golfers
Georgia Tech Yellow Jackets men's golfers
PGA Tour golfers
Korn Ferry Tour graduates
Golfers from Florida
Golfers from Georgia (U.S. state)
People from Rockledge, Florida
Sportspeople from Fulton County, Georgia
1979 births
Living people